Kosoy, Kosoi or Cosoi ( meaning slanting, oblique, etc.) is a Russian masculine surname, its feminine counterpart is Kosaya. It may refer to
Feodosy Kosoy (fl. 1550s), Russian serf-monk 
Stewart Kosoy (1950–2015), American video game designer
Vasily Kosoy (1421–1448), Grand Prince of Moscow
Vassian Patrikeyev (Vassian Kosoy), Russian ecclesiastic and political figure and writer

Russian-language surnames